David Nathan Weiss is an American screenwriter.  He is the screenwriter of All Dogs Go to Heaven and Rock-a-Doodle and co-writer of The Rugrats Movie, Shrek 2, Clockstoppers, Jimmy Neutron: Boy Genius, Rugrats in Paris: The Movie, The Smurfs, its sequel and Disenchanted with writing partner, J. David Stem. He has also written for television shows such as Mission Hill, Cybill, and Roundhouse.

Early life
Weiss grew up in Ventura, California.

Career
Weiss wrote and directed several award-winning shorts and wrote the screenplay for the MGM classic, All Dogs Go to Heaven. With his writing partner, J. David Stem, Weiss served as a head writer for Rugrats  and wrote the holiday special A Rugrats Chanukah.

In 2005, Weiss was elected vice president of the Writers Guild of America, West. In 2009, after serving two terms as vice president, Weiss was elected secretary-treasurer of the Writers Guild of America, West.

Weiss has also written three books for children, including Kay Thompson's bestseller, Eloise in Hollywood (with Stem, for Simon & Schuster). He is a patron of the Insight Film Festival. He has taught at the Ma'aleh School of Television, Film and the Arts in Jerusalem, Israel.

References

External links
 Jewish Impact Films
 

Living people
People from Ventura, California
People from Los Angeles
Place of birth missing (living people)
USC School of Cinematic Arts alumni
American male screenwriters
Animation screenwriters
Baalei teshuva
Former Presbyterians
Screenwriters from California
Year of birth missing (living people)